The 1895–96 Scottish Division One season was won by Celtic by four points over nearest rival Rangers.

League table

Results

References 

1895–96 Scottish Football League
Scottish Division One seasons